Philippe Lefebvre (born 14 May 1941 in Algiers, Alger, France) is a French filmmaker.

Best known as a director and writer, Lefebvre received a nomination for Best Picture at the 1984 Mystfest for his crime-drama film The Judge which he wrote and directed.

References

External links

French film directors
1941 births
Living people
Pieds-Noirs